Bill Rasmovicz is an American poet. He is author of three poetry collections, most recently, Idiopaths. (Brooklyn Arts Press, 2014). His first book, The World in Place of Itself (Alice James Books, 2007), a 2006 Kinereth Gensler Award winner, which also won the 2008 Sheila Motton Award from the New England Poetry Club. Publishers Weekly likened the poems to "the haunted generalities of Franz Wright and the hunted, bomb-damaged villages of Charles Simic," in its review of the book.

Rasmovicz is a graduate of the Vermont College of Fine Arts M.F.A. in Writing Program and the Temple University School of Pharmacy. His poems have appeared in literary journals and magazines including Third Coast (magazine), Hotel Amerika, Nimrod, Puerto del Sol, Gulf Coast and Mid-American Review. He has served as a workshop co-leader and literary excursion leader in Croatia, Slovenia, Germany, Italy, England and Wales. Rasmovicz is a member of the Alice James Books Cooperative Board and lives in New York City.

Published works
 Idiopaths (Brooklyn Arts Press, 2014)
 Gross Ardor (42 Miles Press, 2013)
  The World in Place of Itself (Alice James Books, 2007)

References

External links 
 Video: Bill Rasmovicz Author Page > Alice James Books
 Video: Bill Rasmovicz Reading for The Stain of Poetry Reading Series > January 31, 2009
 Author Website
 Review: Publishers Weekly > Fiction Reviews: Week of 8/20/2007 > The World in Place of Itself by Bill Rasmovicz
 Review: The Comstock Review > Book and Chapbook Reviews:  Comstock Review Poets > Review of The World in Place of Itself
 Poem: Third Coast, Bill Rasmovicz, The 

American male poets
Living people
Poets from New York (state)
Temple University alumni
Vermont College of Fine Arts alumni
Year of birth missing (living people)